Estampage or stamping, is a term commonly used in epigraphy to obtain the exact replica of an inscription that cannot be transported.

According to Jayanti Madhukar, it is defined as:  The Merriam-Webster Dictionary defines it as:

Etymology 
According to T.S. Ravishankar, former director of the Epigraphy branch of the Archaeological Survey of India (ASI), Estampage is a purely Indian term used by Epigraphists.
However, a more linguistically correct explanation would be that it originated from the French word estampage (by itself of Proto-Germanic etymology) that literally means 'stamping' and in practice, can mean either of the two processes, namely industrial stamping of steel (forging) or the artistic stamping of various materials. The latter meaning seems to have been adopted into epigraphy.

Process of estampage 
Estampage is typically obtained by pressing wet paper on to the rock face, over which any ink material (usually, coal or Indian ink) is wiped.

A representative procedure is listed below: 
 Soak a brush in water
 Clean the surface of the stone (that holds the inscription) using the brush.
 Carpet the stone surface using a large piece of wet paper (or layers of paper)
 Pat the wet paper(s) gently, using a dabber made of soft material. 
 Use Indian ink (usually black-colored) to smear the paper with the dabber, in order to get the impression of the surface. 
 Allow the paper to dry on the stone surface. 
 When the paper becomes dry, take it off slowly.
 Observe and verify the ink impression (estampage) emerging as white-colored letters (grooves of the characters) against the dark (black) background.

Epigraphers usually take a long time (days to weeks) to post-process the generated estampages, as they try to decipher, analyze, transliterate and translate the inscribed text.

Usage 
Within India, estampages have been made for numerous items and inscriptions of archaeological significance.
Some of them include:
 Edicts of Ashoka and Estampages of Girnar Edicts in particular
 Syriac/Pahlavi inscriptions of Kerala

Museums and displays 
In 2016, the epigraphy branch of the ASI Southern Zone opened a new, permanent museum and exhibition of estampages  named Eugen Julius Theodor Hultzsch Memorial Museum and Epigraphical Photo Exhibition at the historic Fort St. George at Chennai, South India. This museum is named after E. Hultzsch, a German epigraphist and Indologist renowned for understanding and deciphering the ancient inscriptions of Ashoka, as part of his 159th birthday celebrations.

See also 
 Fernand Courby, a French archaeologist
 Collection of over 10,000 estampages from Greece and Middle East at Maison de l'Orient et de la Méditerranée, Lyon, France

References 

Archaeological corpora
Methods in archaeology
Epigraphy